Ingoda is a village with a Gram panchayat in the Paranda Tehsil of Osmanabad district, Maharashtra state in India.

Demographics
In the 2011 Indian census, Ingoda had population of 1725, with 906 (52.52%) males and 819 (47.47%) females, for a gender ratio of 904 females per thousand males.

Transportation
Rail: The nearest railway station is Kurduvadi Junction on the Mumbai-Solapur route, 45 kilometers from Ingoda. Barshi, on the Kurduwadi-Latur route of the Central Railway, is another station near to Ingoda. The distance between Barshi and Ingoda is 47 kilometers.

Road: Ingoda, Paranda, Barshi, Kurduvadi, and Karmala are connected by state highways. The Maharashtra State Transport bus services are available to Ingoda from Barshi, Kurduwadi, Osmanabad, Bhoom, Karmala, Kharda, Pune and Pimpri-Chinchwad.

Air: Solapur, which is located 123 kilometers from Ingoda, is the nearest airport.

See also
Paranda (Vidhan Sabha constituency)
Paranda
Sina Kolegaon Dam

References

External links
 http://www.icbse.com/schools/zilla-parishad-primary-school-ingoda/27290603101
 http://www.acadym.com/School/509213/ZILLA-PARISHAD-PRIMARY-SCHOOL-INGODA-INGODA-OSMANABAD

Villages in Paranda Tahsil
Villages in Osmanabad district